Lemasters is an unincorporated community in Peters Township in Franklin County, Pennsylvania, United States. Lemasters is located at the intersection of Lemar Road and Steele Avenue, northeast of Mercersburg.

References

Unincorporated communities in Franklin County, Pennsylvania
Unincorporated communities in Pennsylvania